Peter Bethlenfalvy  is a Canadian businessman and politician who has been the minister of finance for Ontario since December 31, 2020. Bethlenfalvy has sat in the Ontario Legislature as the member of Provincial Parliament (MPP) for Pickering—Uxbridge since the 2018 Ontario provincial election, representing the Progressive Conservative (PC) Party. He served as President of the Ontario Treasury Board from 2018 to 2021.

Early life and education 
Bethlenfalvy was born in Montreal, Quebec, to Hungarian immigrants. He earned a bachelor's degree in physiology, a master's in business administration from McGill University, and a master of arts degree from the University of Toronto.

In business, Bethlenfalvy served as the chief investment officer at CST Consultants Inc. He has also held various other senior financial roles: senior vice-president of financial regulations at Manulife Financial, co-president of DBRS Ltd. (where the agency downgraded Ontario's long- and short-term debt ratings in 2009) and as president and chief operating officer of TD Securities in New York.

Political career 
He was elected to the Legislative Assembly of Ontario in the 2018 provincial election. Pickering—Uxbridge was a new provincial riding for 2018. It was created out of parts of Pickering—Scarborough East, Ajax—Pickering and Durham. The PC Party formed government and on June 29, 2018, Bethlenfalvy was appointed president of the Treasury Board in Premier Doug Ford's Cabinet.

In office, Bethlenfalvy has worked on projects such as a line-by-line review of government spending, government modernization initiatives, and controversially, Bill 124, which limits public sector compensation.

Bethlanfalvy became finance minister after the resignation of Rod Phillips on December 31, 2020.

Electoral record

References

Businesspeople from Montreal
Businesspeople from Ontario
Politicians from Montreal
Living people
Finance ministers of Ontario
Progressive Conservative Party of Ontario MPPs
Canadian people of Hungarian descent
People from the Regional Municipality of Durham
21st-century Canadian businesspeople
21st-century Canadian politicians
Year of birth missing (living people)